Bed and board may refer to:
 Bed and Board (film), a 1970 French film
 Divorce from bed and board, a marital arrangement where spouses live apart but do not legally dissolve the marriage